Portulacaria is a genus of succulent plant, classified in its own subfamily Portulacarioideae in the family Didiereaceae. It is indigenous to southern Africa.

Taxonomy
The genus was previously placed in the family Portulacaceae, but according to molecular studies is part of Didiereaceae.

It has further been revised when phylogenetic tests showed conclusively that genus Ceraria was located within Portulacaria, and all Ceraria species have consequently been renamed and moved into this genus.

Species

Species include:

 Portulacaria afra Jacq.
 Portulacaria armiana E. J. Van Jaarsveld
 Portulacaria carrissoana. Previously Ceraria carrissoana Excell & Mendonca
 Portulacaria fruticulosa. Previously Ceraria fruticulosa Pearson & Stephens
 Portulacaria longipedunculata. Previously Ceraria longipedunculata Merxm & Podlech
 Portulacaria namaquensis. Previously Ceraria namaquensis Sond.
 Portulacaria pygmaea. Previously Ceraria pygmaea  Pillans

Uses
Portulacaria afra normally uses  (or Hatch-Slack) carbon fixation but is also able to switch to CAM carbon fixation when drought stressed.

It is a local delicacy and its leaves are eaten by the local peoples. It is also popular internationally as a garden plant. Because of its superficial resemblance to some species in the family Crassulaceae, most of which are toxic, the two are readily, and possibly dangerously, confused by people unaware of the differences.

References

External links

 
Caryophyllales genera
Flora of Southern Africa
Succulent plants